Steven Christopher Crabtree (born June 12, 1955) is an American journalist. He was the Republican nominee for Kentucky Secretary of State in 1995.
Crabtree was a drummer and vocalist with a number of bands that performed throughout the Ohio Valley and the northern panhandle of West Virginia during the 1970s. He left Moundsville, West Virginia, in 1977 for Somerset, Kentucky, to be close to family that had already left West Virginia.

After two years working on campaigns for United States congressman Hal Rogers, a Republican from Kentucky's 5th congressional district, Crabtree went to work as a reporter and later news anchor for WKYT-TV in Lexington, Kentucky, in 1981. Then, in 1982, he married the former Judi Luttrell of Somerset, Kentucky. The couple had three sons; Tyler, Matthew and Cory. In 1985, Kentucky Central Insurance Company, that owned WKYT-TV at the time, signed on WYMT-TV, a CBS affiliate in Hazard, Kentucky, sending Crabtree to the mountains of Eastern Kentucky to be that station's first news anchor and later news director.

In 1987, Crabtree went cross-state to ABC affiliate, WBKO-TV in Bowling Green as news director/anchor, later serving as WBKO-TV Station Operations Manager.

In 1995, Crabtree was the Republican nominee for Kentucky Secretary of State, defeating his GOP primary opponent by a more than three-to-one margin. Crabtree was defeated in the general election by Democrat John Y. Brown, III, son of fast food magnate and former Kentucky Governor John Y. Brown, Jr.

Crabtree later moved his family to Erie, Pennsylvania, where he was news director and anchor for ABC affiliate WJET-TV for three years. In 2000, he relocated to Knoxville, Tennessee, as Vice President for News and Station Operations of WVLT-TV, a CBS affiliate owned by Gray Television. Steve Crabtree resigned from his position as News Director in January, 2011. In a statement to current employees, he is leaving "on his own" to pursue other opportunities. Crabtree will stay till April 2011 or on until a replacement is announced.

References

1955 births
Living people
American male journalists
People from Moundsville, West Virginia
People from Somerset, Kentucky